Blast Off may refer to:

Music

Albums
 Blast Off! (Stray Cats album), a 1989 album by Stray Cats
 Blast Off! (The Blue Hearts album), a 1991 album by The Blue Hearts
 Blast Off, a 1959 album by Ferrante & Teicher
 Blast Off!, a 1970 album by Louis Prima

Songs
 "Blast Off" (song), a 2014 song by David Guetta and Kaz James
 "Blastoff" (Internet Money song) (2020)
 "Blast Off", a 1958 single by The Tyrones
 "Blast Off", a 1979 single by The Shapes
 "Blast Off!", a song by The Birthday Party from the 1982 album Junkyard
 "Blastoffff", a song by Joywave (2018)
 "Blast Off!", a song by Rivers Cuomo from his album Alone: The Home Recordings of Rivers Cuomo
 "Blast Off", a song by Silk Sonic from their 2021 album An Evening with Silk Sonic

Other uses
 Blast Off (video game), a 1989 arcade game by Namco
 Blast-Off (G.I. Joe), a fictional character in the G.I. Joe universe
 Blast Off (Transformers), a Transformers character
 Blast Off, a comic book by Mike Richardson
 Blast Off!, 1997 film directed by Dave Markey

See also
 "Blast off", an expression used during a countdown to a rocket launch
 Blasting Off, a 1991 album by Red Lorry Yellow Lorry
 Blast (disambiguation)